Events from the year 1753 in art.

Events
Jean-Baptiste Perronneau becomes a member of the Académie Royale de Peinture et de Sculpture.

Paintings

 John Giles Eccardt – Richard Bentley
 Jean-Honoré Fragonard – Psyche Showing Her Sisters Her Gifts from Cupid
 Thomas Gainsborough – Couple in a Landscape
 Gavin Hamilton – Portrait of Elizabeth Gunning, Duchess of Hamilton, commissioned by James Hamilton, 6th Duke of Hamilton (c. 1752-1753)
 Gustaf Lundberg – Portrait of Carl Linnaeus (Linné)
 Jean-Baptiste Oudry – The White Duck
 Joshua Reynolds – Captain the Honourable Augustus Keppel (National Maritime Museum, Greenwich)
 Johann Heinrich Tischbein – Self-Portrait in Venetian Masquerade Costume
 Marcos Zapata – The Last Supper (Cathedral of Santo Domingo, Cusco)

Births
February 2 – Giacomo Raffaelli, Italian mosaicist from Rome (died 1836)
February 24 – Henri-Pierre Danloux, French painter (died 1809)
April 15 – Robert Smirke, English painter (died 1845)
May 1 – Joseph Bergler the Younger, painter and etcher (died 1829)
May 12 – Agustín Esteve, Spanish portraitist and court painter to the Spanish Crown (died 1830)
August 12 – Thomas Bewick, English wood engraver (died 1828)
September 10 – Sir John Soane, British architect (died 1837)
October 12 – Lié Louis Périn-Salbreux, painter, pastellist and miniaturist (died 1817)
November – Sir Francis Bourgeois, court painter to King George III (died 1811)
November 6 – Mikhail Kozlovsky, Russian Neoclassical sculptor active during the Age of Enlightenment (died 1802)
November 14 – Francis Nicholson, landscape painter (died 1844)
December 12 – Sir William Beechey, portrait painter (died 1839)
date unknown
Joseph Barney, English painter (died 1832)
Pierre Chasselat, French miniature painter (died 1814)
Francisco Agustín y Grande, Spanish painter of the Neoclassic style (died 1800)
probable
Fyodor Alekseyev, Russian painter of landscape art (died 1824)
Utamaro, Japanese printmaker and painter, especially of woodblock prints (ukiyo-e) (died 1806)

Deaths
 January 9 – Lars Gallenius, Finnish painter (born 1658)
 July 8 – Federiko Benković, Croatian painter (born 1667)
 August 5 – Johann Gottfried Auerbach, Austrian painter (born 1697)
 September 16 – Georg Wenzeslaus von Knobelsdorff, painter and architect in Prussia (born 1699)
 September 18 – Hristofor Zhefarovich is best remembered as a painter, engraver and writer working in Belgrade (born 1699)
 November – Giuseppe Valentini, Italian violinist, painter, poet and composer (born 1681)
 December 15 – Richard Boyle, 3rd Earl of Burlington, English architect (born 1694)
 December 18 – Miyagawa Chōshun, Japanese painter in the ukiyo-e style (born 1683)
 date unknown
 Gao Xiang, Qing Chinese painter, and one of the Eight Eccentrics of Yangzhou (born 1688)
 André Jean, French artist (born 1662)
 Francesco Polazzo, Italian painter of portraits and historical subjects (born 1683)
 Miguel Posadas, Spanish painter (born 1711)
 Candido Vitali, Italian painter of still life of animals, birds, flower, and fruit (born 1680)
 probable – Angelo Trevisani, Italian painter, active mainly in Venice (born 1669)

 
Years of the 18th century in art
1750s in art